David de Rambures (born in 1364, died October 25, 1415 at the battle of Agincourt) was a French knight, member of the king's council and Grand Master of Crossbowmen. He died at the Battle of Agincourt along with his three youngest sons, John, Hughes and Philip.

Life and Marriage 
David de Rambures (1364-1415) was the son of André (nicknamed Andrieux) de Rambures (- 1405), knight, lord of Rambures, captain of Boulogne and Gravelines, governor of the West-West Flanders province, chamberlain of King Charles VI and Jeanne de Brégny. He married Catherine d'Auxy, Dame de Dompiere and Escouy, daughter of Enguerrand d'Auxy (? - 1374) and Isabelle de Goulons. They had four sons.

In 1412 he started the construction of the current Château de Rambures, which was interrupted at his death.

Military career 
Squire, he served at the Hotel du Roi Charles VI (1386) and in Germany.

He was placed, thanks to his father, very early in the Hotel of the king and began his military career as a squire in the company of his father in 1387. He served in Germany in 1388 and fought on many battlefields at the beginning of the 15th century, which led him to the highest offices. He served in Picardy in 1404, under the Comte de Saint-Pol, with four knights and twenty squires. He was taken prisoner at Mercq near Calais with Jean V de Hangest. His father Andreux and brother Jean died in this battle. He served in Guyenne in 1408 and became captain of the castle of Airaines, the same year. Then, in 1410, he set out for Genoa to strengthen Marshal de Boucicaut with Raoul de Gaucourt. He served in Orleans with James II of Bourbon-La Marche in 1411.

He became great master of the French Crossbowmen in 1411 with a salary of £2,000 a year and a bonus of £600.

He defended Ponthieu and Artois, captain of Boulogne (1415), he commanded Dieppe against the English.

Political career 
Familiar of the Court of Burgundy, he attended the marriage of Marguerite of Burgundy with Guillaume de Hainaut in 1385, that of John of Burgundy with Marguerite of Bavaria and that of Antoine of Burgundy with Jeanne of Luxembourg in Arras, in 1402. He was chamberlain of the Duke of Burgundy Philip the Bold in 1401-1402.

He was a member of the king's council in 1402 and in 1410 became chamberlain to the Duke of Guyenne. After the Treaty of Bicetre of December 10, 1410, he was one of the twelve knights who were members of the Council of Regency, in charge of the government during the madness of Charles VI. His attachment to the Duke of Burgundy caused his dismissal in 1413.

He then served the Duke of Burgundy Jean sans Peur in 1413 and then in the service of the Dauphin in 1414, of which he became the commissioner for the execution of the Treaty of Arras.

Literature 
 William Shakespeare, in his play Henry V, called him Lord Rambures, the master of the French crossbows.

Bibliography 
 Philippe Seydoux, The Castle of Rambures, in Picardy, Editions de La Morande, 1974

References

1364 births
1415 deaths
Medieval French knights
People of the Hundred Years' War
French military personnel killed in action